Chittagong Mohammedan Sporting Club is a sports club based in Chittagong, Bangladesh. The club was established in 1950. Chittagong Mohammedan is considered as most successful club of Chittagong Premier League with record 19 titles.

History

The team was one of the participants of inaugural season of Bangladesh Premier League in 2007 and competed in first three seasons of the league. They suffered relegation in 2010–11 B. League and didn't participate in any league for five years.

In 2016, Chittagong Mohammedan returned to domestic professional football by participating in 2016 Bangladesh Championship League, the second-tier football league of the country. But they failed again to prevent relegation. After that, they didn't compete in any professional football league.

References

Association football clubs established in 1950
Sport in Bangladesh
Football clubs in Bangladesh
Sport in Chittagong